New People (  or អ្នកថ្មី  or អ្នក១៧មេសា, neak dap pram pii mesa,  'April 17th people') were civilian Cambodians who were controlled and exploited by the Khmer Rouge regime in Cambodia (officially then known as Democratic Kampuchea) from 1975 to 1979.  Generally, anyone who was from an urban area was made a New Person and people from rural areas were made Old People (អ្នកចាស់ neak chas or អ្នកមូលដ្ឋាន neak moultanh).

New People were not allowed any property and they were forced to work at least 10 hours a day, and often more. Their food rations were so small they led to starvation. Disease was rampant and in 1976 it was estimated that 80% of the Cambodian population had malaria.

One of the Khmer Rouge mottos, in reference to the New People, was "To keep you is no benefit. To destroy you is no loss."

See also 
 Year Zero (political notion)
Dehumanization
Untermensch

References

Cambodian genocide
Khmer Rouge
Political terminology